Gold Dust Noise is the first studio album by the rock band Kid Galahad. It was released in 2002 on Ignition Records. The album was produced by Jim Abbiss.

Track listing
All tracks written by A.Bull, D.Ody, P.Seaman, D.Strows
"Where's My Gold?" – 4:09
"Stealin' Beats" – 4:00
"Skedaddle" – 4:13
"Swimming to Shore" – 4:30
"Salvation" – 4:53
"Runaway Train" – 3:36
"Pack It In" – 3:14
"World Crashes Down" – 5:13
"Distant Sunshine" – 3:25
"I Don't Wanna Play" – 8:21

Personnel
Ash Bull – vocals
Dave Ody – Guitar
Paul Seaman – Bass guitar
D. "Wookie" Strows – drums
Jim Abbiss – Production and Mixing

References

Kid Galahad (band) albums
2002 albums
Albums produced by Jim Abbiss